Richardson is an unincorporated community in Calhoun County, West Virginia, United States.

History

Founder Charles H. Richardson in 1866, serving WV House of Delegates in 1885 and early postmaster. Village boomed circa 1900, an event linked to oil and gas discovery.  The community had a water mill on the West Fork of the Little Kanawha, as well as a church, general stores, a hotel, a barbershop, a shoemaker, a blacksmith shop, a doctor's office, drug store, a lumber dealer, and numerous livestock producers. After the oil and gas boom came to the area in the early 1900s, drilling was followed by the construction of a large gas compressor station with company houses, and featured 20th century rejuvenation of the village.

References 

Unincorporated communities in West Virginia
Unincorporated communities in Calhoun County, West Virginia